Agnolotti is a type of pasta typical of the Piedmont region of Italy, made with small pieces of flattened pasta dough, folded over a filling of roasted meat or vegetables. Agnolotti is the plural form of the Italian word agnolotto. According to a legend, the origin of the name may come from a cook called Angiolino, or "Angelot", an individual from Montferrat who is said to be the inventor of the recipe. Agnolotti can be di magro or di grasso depending on their filling of vegetables or meat.

Overview
Although their primitive shape was semi-circular, traditionally agnolotti are of a square shape with sides of about one or two inches. However, they can also be of a smaller, rectangular shape when they are called agnolotti al plin. Plin means "a pinch", because one pinches with thumb and forefinger between each mound of filling to close and seal the little pasta packets. Agnolotti al plin are almost always stuffed with meat. One of the traditional ways to serve agnolotti del plin is to dump them onto a napkin after draining the pasta water and serve them dry with no condiment; this is reminiscent of the habit of farmers to bring food wrapped in napkins to consume during the workday. 

Agnolotti are prepared by immersion in boiling water. Typically, they are dressed with beef broth and a little melted butter or in a fresh sage and melted butter sauce, as a complex sauce would detract from the flavours in the agnolotti pockets. In both cases they may be topped with Parmigiano-Reggiano cheese, but no cheese is contained within agnolotti. The dish is associated with Piedmont in Italy and is not to be confused with Piacenza's stuffed pasta pockets called anolini.

In the Monferrato region of Italy, located within Piedmont, a special version of agnolotti is filled with donkey meat. Robiola cheese is another popular ingredient in  Piedmont.

See also
 
 List of dumplings
 Italian Cuisine
 Piedmontese Cuisine

References

External links

Cuisine of Piedmont
Dumplings
Types of pasta
Stuffed dishes
Meat dishes